The Football Association of Malaysia National Football Awards are presented to the best football local and foreign players and coaches. They have been awarded since the 2005–06 season.

Sponsorship 
Since the establishment of the National Football Awards, it has had title sponsorship rights sold to two companies; 100plus was the most recent title sponsor.

 2007–present: 100plus (100plus National Football Awards)
 2005–06: Coca-Cola (Coca-Cola FAM National Football Awards)

Winners

Players

Goalkeeper

Formerly known as Most Favourite Goalkeeper (2005–07), now the award is called Best Goalkeeper Award. Shown below are the winners of the best goalkeeper award, as chosen by the public.

Defender

Formerly known as Most Favourite Defender (2005–07), it is now known as Best Defender Award. Tabulated below are the winner of favourite defenders voted by public.

Midfielder
Formerly known as Most Favourite Midfielder (2005–07), it is now known as Best Midfielder Award. Tabulated below are the winner of favourite midfielders voted by public.

Striker

Formerly known as Most Favourite Striker (2005–07), it is now known as Best Striker Award. Tabulated below are the winner of favourite strikers voted by public.

Most Popular Player

Tabulated below are the overall most favourite player selected by voting.

Most Valuable Players

For the Most Valuable Players award, it has a winner for both local and foreign players. From 2008 to 2011, only local players were involved, because FAM had banned foreign players from participating in M-League. Formerly known as Supermokh Most Valuable Player (2011), it is now known as Most Valuable Players Award.

Best Foreign Players

Best Asean Players

Most Promising/Best Young Players

Golden Boot Award

The Golden Boot award is awarded to the top scorer of Malaysia Super League and Malaysia Premier League in that particular season.

Malaysia Super League Golden Boots Award

Malaysia Premier League Golden Boots Award

Malaysia M3 League Golden Boots Award

Coaches

Formerly known as Most Favourite Coach (2005–07), it is now known as Best Coach Award.

Teams/ Clubs

Best Football Associations

Formerly known as Most Favourite Football Association (2005–06), it is now known as Best Football Association/Club Award.

Fair Play

Best Supporter Clubs

Best Social Media

Best Team's Website

Most Favourite Manager

This category no longer available since 2005–06.

Most Favourite Sport Broadcaster

This category no longer available since 2005–06.

FAM Special Award

Referee

Formerly known as Most Favourite Referee (2005–06), it is now known as Best Referee. In some seasons, the assistant referees were also awarded with Best Assistant Referee.

Woman Football

Known as "Best Women Footballer"

Futsal

Best Men Futsal Player

Best Women Futsal Player

See also

Football Association of Malaysia

References

External links
 Football Association of Malaysia Site
Anugerah Bola Sepak Kebangsaan 2006–2015 (In Malay)
Anugerah Bola Sepak Kebangsaan 2016 (In Malay)
Anugerah Bola Sepak Kebangsaan 2017 (In Malay)
Anugerah Bola Sepak Kebangsaan 2018 (In Malay)
Anugerah Bola Sepak Kebangsaan 2022 (In Malay)

Association football trophies and awards
Malaysian awards
Sport in Malaysia
Awards established in 2005
2005 establishments in Malaysia